Prairie Branch is a stream in Pike County in the U.S. state of Missouri. It is a tributary of Indian Creek.

Prairie Branch took its name from West Prairie, a prairie along its course.

See also
List of rivers of Missouri

References

Rivers of Pike County, Missouri
Rivers of Missouri